Zhang Li (born 3 February 1980 in Shanghai, China) is a Chinese baseball player who was a member of Team China at the 2008 Summer Olympics.

Sports career
1989-1994 Changning District Dingxi Middle School;
1994-1996 Pudong Chuansha Peihua Middle School;
1996-1998 Shanghai Water Sports Center;
1998–present Shanghai Municipal Sports School;
2004 National Baseball Team

Major performances
1997 National Championship - 1st;
2005 National Games - 2nd;
2005 Asian Championship - 3rd;
2006 Asian Games - 4th

References
Profile 2008 Olympics Team China

1980 births
2006 World Baseball Classic players
2009 World Baseball Classic players
Baseball players at the 2006 Asian Games
Baseball players at the 2008 Summer Olympics
Baseball players from Shanghai
Chinese baseball players
Living people
Olympic baseball players of China
Shanghai Golden Eagles players
Asian Games competitors for China